Bain's Vlei is a settlement on the road to Kimberley, situated 8 km west of Bloemfontein. It is named after the owner, Andrew Hudson Bain, who bought it in 1849.

References

Populated places in Mangaung